Koh-Lanta: Viêtnam was the tenth season of Koh-Lanta, the French version of reality television series Survivor. This season took place in Con Dao, Vietnam. The two original tribes this season were Do and Vang. For second time in the show, the men's is the red tribe and the women's is the yellow tribe. However, two contestants (Véronique & Boris) will be the only members of their gender on their tribe. The season premiered on 17 September 2010 & concluded 17 December 2010 where Philippe Duron won the season in a 6-1 jury vote against Claude Dartois to win the prize of €100,000 & the title of Sole Survivor.

Finishing order

Future appearances
Marine Plissonneau, Claude Dartois and Wafa El Mejjad later returned for Koh-Lanta: La Revanche des Héros. Laurence Pizzocchia and Philippe Duron returned for Koh-Lanta: La Nouvelle Édition. Dartois later returned for a third time for Koh-Lanta: L'Île des héros. Dartois returned for a fourth time in Koh-Lanta: La Légende.

Challenges

Voting History

Notes

References

External links
(Official Site) 
 (French page) 

2010 French television seasons
10
Television shows filmed in Vietnam